Manea Saeed Khudoum Al-Baroud (Arabic:مانع سعيد خدوم البارود) (born 17 April 1994) is an Emirati footballer. He currently plays for Al Dhaid as a winger .

External links

References

Emirati footballers
1994 births
Living people
Sharjah FC players
Al-Ittihad Kalba SC players
Dibba Al-Hisn Sports Club players
Al Hamriyah Club players
Al Dhaid SC players
UAE First Division League players
UAE Pro League players
Association football wingers